WOGR may refer to:

 WOGR (AM), a radio station (1540 AM) licensed to Charlotte, North Carolina, United States
 WOGR-FM, a radio station (93.3 FM) licensed to Salisbury, North Carolina, United States